George William Francis Sackville Russell, 10th Duke of Bedford DL (16 April 1852 – 23 March 1893) was a British peer and politician. He was the son of Francis Russell, 9th Duke of Bedford and Lady Elizabeth Sackville-West.

Russell graduated from Balliol College, Oxford in 1874 with a Bachelor of Arts (B.A.) and was admitted to Lincoln's Inn, as a barrister.

On 24 October 1876, he married Lady Adeline Marie Somers, daughter of Charles Somers, 3rd Earl Somers. They had no children, but it is known that he had at least one illegitimate child, an Indian daughter. She lived with the pair until her father died and was then sent to live with her uncle, Herbrand Russell, and his family. She lived on the estate until she was married.

Russell was a Liberal Member of Parliament for Bedfordshire between 1875 and 1885, when the constituency was abolished. He was High Sheriff of Bedfordshire in 1889 and was later a Deputy Lieutenant of the county.

In 1891, Russell inherited the title of Duke of Bedford, together with Woburn Abbey and several other estates which went with it, including Chenies, Buckinghamshire, and the Bedford Estate, a sizeable area of central London including Bedford Square, Russell Square, Bloomsbury Square and Covent Garden.

In 1893, at the age of forty, he died of diabetes, at number 37, Chesham Place, London, and was buried in the 'Bedford Chapel' at St. Michael's Church at Chenies. His titles and estates were inherited by his younger brother Herbrand Russell.

References

External links 
 

1852 births
1893 deaths
Deaths from diabetes
Deputy Lieutenants of Bedfordshire
410
Tavistock, George Russell, Marquis of
UK MPs 1874–1880
UK MPs 1880–1885
Bedford, D10
G
Liberal Party (UK) MPs for English constituencies
High Sheriffs of Bedfordshire